Boophis lilianae is a species of frogs in the family Mantellidae. It is endemic to Madagascar and only known with certainty from its type locality near Tolongoina. There is also a possible record from the Ranomafana National Park.

References

lilianae
Endemic frogs of Madagascar
Amphibians described in 2008
Taxa named by Frank Glaw
Taxa named by Jörn Köhler
Taxa named by Miguel Vences